Wennigsen is a municipality in the district of Hanover, in Lower Saxony, Germany. It is situated near the Deister hills, approx. 15 km southwest of Hanover.

Geography
Wennigsen borders on (from north and clockwise) Gehrden, Ronnenberg, Springe and Barsinghausen. The highest elevation is the Bröhn, the highest hill of the Deister with 405 meters.

History
The founding date of Wennigsen is unknown. It possibly dates back to 5th to 8th century. The first dated occurrence (1199 to 1206) is a copy of a certificate from bishop Hartbert of Hildesheim. At this time there was a settlement of Bernhard, earl of Poppenburg, in Wennigsen. He had three roses each with five leaves in his coat of arms. Today Wennigsen bears one of them in its coat of arms.

During the Thirty Years' War Wennigsen was near to be completely destroyed.

Duke George William of Hanover (later of Brunswick-Lüneburg) split the Großvogtei Calenberg and founded a new Amt Calenberg in which Wennigsen became court place. The Magistrates' Court of Wennigsen still exists.

Notable people 
 Adolph Freiherr Knigge (1752-1796), born in Bredenbeck, writer of the Enlightenment.
 Heinz Erhardt (1909-1979), comedian, musician and actor, lived at the Wennigser Mark 
 Gesine Meissner (born 1952), politician (FDP), a member of the European Parliament
 Hans-Georg Wenzel (1949-1999), geodesist, geophysicist and university lecturer
 Christoph Meineke (born 1979), former mayor of Wennigsen (Deister)

References

Hanover Region